is a passenger railway station located in the city of Takasago, Hyōgo Prefecture, Japan, operated by the private Sanyo Electric Railway.

Lines

Station layout
The station consists of two unnumbered ground-level side platforms connected by a level crossing. The station is unattended.

Platforms

Adjacent stations

|-
!colspan=5|Sanyo Electric Railway

History
It was renamed  in February 1924 and to its present name on April 7, 1991.

The station building received renovations in 1989.

Passenger statistics
In fiscal 2018, the station was used by an average of 1844 passengers daily (boarding passengers only).

Surrounding area
 Takasago City Sone Citizen Service Corner
 Former Irie family residence
Takasago City Sone Elementary School

See also
List of railway stations in Japan

References

External links

  Official website (Sanyo Electric Railway) 

Railway stations in Japan opened in 1923
Railway stations in Hyōgo Prefecture
Takasago, Hyōgo